Ernest Eddie Kirkup (born 1929), is a male former athlete who competed for England.

Athletics career
He represented England in the marathon at the 1958 British Empire and Commonwealth Games in Cardiff, Wales.

Personal life
He was a member of the Rotherham Harriers.

References

1929 births
English male marathon runners
Athletes (track and field) at the 1958 British Empire and Commonwealth Games
Living people
Commonwealth Games competitors for England